The National Film Awards is the most prominent film award ceremony in India. Established in 1954, it has been administered, along with the International Film Festival of India and the Indian Panorama, by the Indian government's Directorate of Film Festivals since 1973.

Every year, a national panel appointed by the government selects the winning entry, and the award ceremony is held in New Delhi, where the President of India presents the awards. This is followed by the inauguration of the National Film Festival, where award-winning films are screened for the public. Declared for films produced in the previous year across the country, they hold the distinction of awarding merit to the best of Indian cinema overall, as well as presenting awards for the best films in each region and language of the country.

History 

The Awards were first presented in 1954. The Government of India conceived the ceremony to honor films made across India, on a national scale, to encourage the furthering of Indian art and culture. Since 1973, the Indian Directorate of Film Festivals administers the ceremony along with other major film events in India annually.

Juries and rules 
The National Film Awards are presented in two main categories: Feature Films and Non-Feature Films. The juries are appointed by the Directorate of Film Festivals in India. Neither the Government nor the Directorate has influence over which films are selected for consideration and which films ultimately win awards. There are strict criteria as to whether a film is eligible for consideration by the jury panels. Over 100 films made across the country are entered in each category (Feature and Non-Feature) for the awards and are deemed eligible each year.

A list of rules is presented every year in a document of regulations known as the National Film Award Regulations. The criteria for eligibility contain many clauses. Among them, there is a direct requirement for the makers of a film, and particularly the director, to be Indian nationals. Films entering the competition should be produced in India, and in the case of co-production involving a foreign entity, there are as many as six conditions that should be fulfilled in order for the film to qualify. According to the criteria, in order to be eligible for consideration by the jury, a film should be certified by the Central Board of Film Certification between 1 January and 31 December. Whether a film is considered a feature film or a non-feature film shall be decided by the Feature Film jury. The eligibility list includes a section of rules determining which films shall not be eligible for entry in the competition.

Awards 

The Awards are categorized into three sections; Feature Films, Non-Feature Films, and Best Writing on Cinema. With each section having its individual aims, Feature Film and Non-Feature Film sections aim at encouraging the production of films of aesthetic and technical excellence and social relevance, contributing to the understanding and appreciation of cultures of different regions of the country in cinematic form, thereby promoting unity and integrity of the nation. The Best Writing on Cinema section aims to encourage the study and appreciation of cinema as an art form and dissemination of information and critical appreciation of the art form through the publication of various books, articles, reviews, newspaper coverage, and studies.

In addition, a lifetime achievement award, named after the father of Indian cinema Dadasaheb Phalke, is awarded to a film personality for the outstanding contribution to the growth and development of Indian Cinema.

All the award winners are awarded a Medallion, a cash prize, and a certificate of merit. Six categories from the Feature Films section, two from the Non-Feature Films and Best Writing on Cinema sections each have been made eligible for Swarna Kamal (Golden Lotus Award), and the rest of the categories for Rajat Kamal (Silver Lotus Award).

Lifetime Achievement Award 
 Dadasaheb Phalke Award

Feature Film Awards

Golden Lotus Award 

Official name - Swarna Kamal

 Best Feature Film
 Best Director
 Best Popular Film Providing Wholesome Entertainment
 Best Children's Film
 Best Debut Film of a Director
 Best Animated Film

Silver Lotus Award 

Official name: Rajat Kamal

 Best Actor
 Best Actress
 Best Supporting Actor
 Best Supporting Actress
 Best Child Artist
 Best Music Direction
 Best Male Playback Singer
 Best Female Playback Singer
 Best Lyrics
 Best Art Direction
 Best Audiography
 Best Choreography
 Best Cinematography
 Best Costume Design
 Best Editing
 Best Make-up
 Best Screenplay
 Best Special Effects
 Best Stunt Choreography
 Special Jury Award
 Special Mention

 Best Film on Environment Conservation / Preservation
 Best Film on Family Welfare
 Best Film on National Integration
 Best Film on Other Social Issues

Best Feature Film in 17 of the 22 languages specified in the Eighth Schedule of the Constitution of India:

Best Feature Film in Assamese
Best Feature Film in Bengali
Best Feature Film in Bodo
Best Feature Film in Dogri
Best Feature Film in Gujarati
Best Feature Film in Hindi
Best Feature Film in Kannada
Best Feature Film in Kashmiri
Best Feature Film in Konkani
Best Feature Film in Malayalam
Best Feature Film in Manipuri
Best Feature Film in Marathi
Best Feature Film in Odia
Best Feature Film in Punjabi
Best Feature Film in Tamil
Best Feature Film in Telugu
Best Feature Film in Urdu

Best Feature Film in each of the languages other than those specified in the Eighth Schedule of the Constitution of India:

Best Feature Film in Bhojpuri
Best Feature Film in English
Best Feature Film in Khasi
Best Feature Film in Kodava
Best Feature Film in Kokborok
Best Feature Film in Monpa
Best Feature Film in Tulu

Discontinued Awards 

 Second Best Feature Film
 Third Best Feature Film
 Best Story

Non-Feature Film Awards

Golden Lotus Award 

Official name: Swarna Kamal

 Best Non-Feature Film
 Best Director

Silver Lotus Award 

Official name: Rajat Kamal

 Best First Film of a Director
 Best Audiography
 Best Cinematography
 Special Jury Award / Special Mention
 Best Editing
 Best Music Direction
 Best Narration / Voice Over

 Best Agriculture Film
 Best Animation Film
 Best Anthropological / Ethnographic Film
 Best Arts / Cultural Film
 Best Biographical Film
 Best Educational / Motivational / Instructional Film
 Best Environment/Conservation/Preservation Film
 Best Exploration / Adventure Film
 Best Film on Family Welfare
 Best Historical Reconstruction / Compilation Film
 Best Investigative Film
 Best Promotional Film
 Best Scientific Film
 Best Short Fiction Film
 Best Film on Social Issues

Discontinued Awards 

 Best Experimental Film
 Best Filmstrip
 Best Industrial Film
 Best News Review
 Best Newsreel Cameraman

Writing on Cinema

Golden Lotus Award 

Official name: Swarna Kamal

 Best Book on Cinema
 Best Film Critic

Records

References

Further reading

External links 

 Directorate of Film Festivals
 National Film Awards at IMDb

 
Indian film awards
Awards established in 1954
1954 establishments in India